The System of the World can refer to several things:
The System of the World (novel), a 2005 book by Neal Stephenson
The third book of Isaac Newton's Philosophiæ Naturalis Principia Mathematica 
Newton's preliminary work of 1685, printed in English and in Latin (1728) under the titles Treatise of the System of the World and De mundi Systemate